Nižné Ružbachy is a village and municipality in Stará Ľubovňa District in the Prešov Region of northern Slovakia.

History
In historical records the village was first mentioned in 1287.

Geography
The municipality lies at an altitude of 555 metres and covers an area of 9.794 km². It has a population of about 639 people.

External links
https://web.archive.org/web/20070513023228/http://www.statistics.sk/mosmis/eng/run.html

Villages and municipalities in Stará Ľubovňa District